Bartolo Longo (February 10, 1841 – October 5, 1926) was an Italian lawyer who has been beatified by the Roman Catholic Church. He was a former Satanic priest who returned to the Catholic faith and became a third order Dominican, dedicating his life to the Rosary and the Virgin Mary. He was eventually awarded a papal knighthood of the Order of the Holy Sepulchre.

Early years
Bartolo Longo, was born into a wealthy family on February 10, 1841 in the small town of Latiano, near Brindisi, in southern Italy. His parents were devout Roman Catholics. In 1851, Longo's father died and his mother remarried a lawyer. Despite Longo's stepfather wanting him to become a teacher, Longo was set on becoming a lawyer. In 1861, Longo succeeded in convincing his stepfather and was sent to the University of Naples to study law.

In the 1860s, the Catholic Church in Italy found itself at odds with a strong nationalistic movement. General Giuseppe Garibaldi, who played a key role in Italian unification, saw the Pope as an antagonist to Italian nationalism and actively campaigned for the elimination of the papal office altogether. The Catholic Church in Europe was also competing with a growing popularity in Spiritualism and Occultism. Because of this, many students at the University of Naples took part in demonstrations against the pope, dabbled in witchcraft and consulted Neapolitan mediums. Longo became involved with a movement that he claimed led him into a Satanist cult. After some study and several "spiritual" experiences Longo said that he was ordained as a satanic priest.

Conversion

In the following years, Longo's life became one of "depression, nervousness, and confusion". Bothered by paranoia and anxiety, he turned to a hometown friend, Vincenzo Pepe, for guidance. It was Pepe who convinced him, in Longo's account, to abandon Satanism and introduced him to the Dominican priest Alberto Radente who led him to a devotion to the Rosary. On October 7, 1871, Longo became a Dominican tertiary and took the name "Rosario". Around this time, he reportedly visited a séance and held up a rosary, declaring, "I renounce spiritualism because it is nothing but a maze of error and falsehood." He also came to know some Franciscans with whom he helped the poor and incurably ill for two years. Bartolo also kept up his law practice, which took him to the nearby village of Pompei. He went to Pompei to take care of the affairs of Countess Marianna Farnararo De Fusco.

In Pompei, Longo later recounted, he was shocked at the erosion of the people's faith. He wrote, "Their religion was a mixture of superstition and popular tradition. ... For their every need, ... they would go to a witch, a sorceress, in order to obtain charms and witchcraft." Through talking to the citizens, Bartolo came to recognize their severe lack of catechesis. When he asked one man if there was only one God, the fellow answered, "When I was a child, I remember people telling me there were three. Now, after so many years, I don't know if one of them is dead or one has married."

Longo wrote of his personal struggles with mental illness, paranoia, depression and anxiety. At one point, he noted struggling with suicidal thoughts, but rejected them by recalling the promise of Dominic, "he who propagates my Rosary will be saved." Longo wrote that this promise is what convinced him to encourage public devotion to the rosary.

Shrine of Our Lady of Pompei

With the help of Countess Mariana di Fusco, he inaugurated a confraternity of the Rosary and in October 1873 started restoring a dilapidated church. He sponsored a festival in honor of Our Lady of the Rosary.

In 1875, Longo obtained as a gift a painting portraying Our Lady of the Rosary, with Saint Dominic and Saint Catherine of Siena. M. Concetta de Litala, a religious sister of the Monastery of the Rosary at Porta Medina, had been holding it for the Dominican priest Alberto Radente. Radente had acquired it from a junk-shop dealer in Naples for a very small sum. The painting was in bad condition and Longo wrote of his immediate distaste of the poor artistic quality when he first saw it. However, he accepted the gift to conserve funds and to not insult Concetta. Longo raised funds to restore the image and placed it in the church in an effort to encourage pilgrimages.

Alleged miracles began to be reported and people began flocking in droves to the church. Longo was encouraged by the Bishop of Nola to begin the construction of a larger church—the cornerstone being laid on May 8, 1876. The church was consecrated in May 1891 by Cardinal La Valletta (representing Pope Leo XIII). In 1939, the church was enlarged to a basilica, known today as the Basilica of Our Lady of the Most Holy Rosary of Pompei.

Later life and death

At the suggestion of Pope Leo XIII, Bartolo Longo and the Countess Mariana di Fusco were married on April 7, 1885. The couple remained continent (abstained from intercourse), and continued to do many charitable works and provided for orphaned children and the children of prisoners, which was radical for its time. In 1906 they donated the entire property of the Pompei shrine to the Holy See. Longo continued promoting the Rosary until his death on October 5, 1926, at the age of 85. The piazza on which his basilica stands has since been named in memory of Longo. His body is encased in a glass tomb and he is wearing the mantle of a Knight of the Order of the Holy Sepulchre, a papal order of knighthood.

Beatification
On October 26, 1980, he was beatified by Pope John Paul II, who would call him the "Apostle of the Rosary" and mentioned him specifically in his apostolic letter "Rosarium Virginis Mariae" (The Rosary of the Virgin Mary).

On October 7, 2003, Pope John Paul II prayed for world peace at the basilica. More than 30,000 people were waiting to greet him as he flew in by helicopter.

References

External links

 
Pope John Paul II's Pastoral Visit to the Shrine of Our Lady of the Rosary of Pompei, 7 October 2003
Biography of Blessed Bartolo Longo by Angelo Stagnaro
From Satanist to Saint by Fr. Roger J. Landry, 31 October 2008
 Frisk, M. Jean. "Our Lady of Pompeii", Marian Library, University of Dayton

1841 births
1926 deaths
20th-century venerated Christians
Italian beatified people
Former Satanists
Italian anti-communists
Italian Dominicans
20th-century Italian lawyers
Lay Dominicans
People from Pompei
People from the Province of Brindisi
University of Naples Federico II alumni
Beatifications by Pope John Paul II
Knights of the Holy Sepulchre
Converts to Roman Catholicism from pagan religions
Anti-Masonry